The 1963 Washington Huskies football team was an American football team that represented the University of Washington during the 1963 NCAA University Division football season.  Under seventh-year head coach Jim Owens, the team lost their first three games, compiled a 6–4 record in the regular season, and won the Athletic Association of Western Universities (AAWU,  

On New Year's Day at the  It was the third Rose Bowl for Washington under Owens and their first loss; they had won consecutive games in January 1960 and 1961.  The Huskies did not return to Pasadena for fourteen years, a victory in January 1978 in head coach Don James' third season.

Halfback Dave Kopay and center John Stupey were the team captains. In its eleven games, Washington outscored its opponents 183 to 141.

Schedule

The final regular season game (Apple Cup) was postponed a week following the assassination of President Kennedy.

All-Coast

Professional football draft selections
Two University of Washington Huskies were selected in the 1964 NFL Draft, which lasted twenty rounds with 280 selections. One Husky was selected in the 1964 AFL Draft, which lasted twenty six rounds with 208 selections.

References

Washington
Washington Huskies football seasons
Pac-12 Conference football champion seasons
Washington Huskies football